Yalaha is an unincorporated area and census-designated place (CDP) in Lake County, Florida, United States. The population was 1,364 at the 2010 census, up from 1,175 at the 2000 census. It is part of the Orlando–Kissimmee Metropolitan Statistical Area.

Geography

Yalaha is located in central Lake County on the south shore of Lake Harris. It is bordered to the west by the Leesburg city limits and to the southeast by the town of Howey-in-the-Hills.

Most of the water area is part of Lake Harris, part of the upper Ocklawaha River basin.

Demographics

As of the census of 2000, there were 1,175 people, 521 households, and 385 families residing in the CDP. The racial makeup of the CDP was 83.66% White, 11.83% African American, 0.17% Native American, 0.77% Asian, 2.38% from other races, and 1.19% from two or more races. Hispanic or Latino of any race were 4.68% of the population.

There were 521 households, out of which 18.2% had children under the age of 18 living with them, 64.7% were married couples living together, 6.1% had a female householder with no husband present, and 26.1% were non-families. 23.8% of all households were made up of individuals, and 15.0% had someone living alone who was 65 years of age or older.  The average household size was 2.24 and the average family size was 2.62.

In the CDP, the population was spread out, with 17.1% under the age of 18, 3.7% from 18 to 24, 20.8% from 25 to 44, 29.0% from 45 to 64, and 29.4% who were 65 years of age or older.  The median age was 50 years. For every 100 females, there were 94.2 males.  For every 100 females age 18 and over, there were 96.4 males.

The median income for a household in the CDP was $31,940, and the median income for a family was $38,026. Males had a median income of $31,932 versus $22,829 for females. The per capita income for the CDP was $19,734.  About 6.0% of families and 11.2% of the population were below the poverty line, including 21.2% of those under age 18 and 11.5% of those age 65 or over.

References

Census-designated places in Lake County, Florida
Greater Orlando
Census-designated places in Florida
Former municipalities in Florida